The Australian Netball Hall of Fame was established by Netball Australia in 2008. The inaugural inductees included Margaret Caldow, Anne Sargeant, Vicki Wilson and Joyce Brown.

Athlete members 
The following Australian netball international players have been inducted into the Hall of Fame.

General Members 
The following umpires, administrators and coaches have been inducted into the Hall of Fame.

Gallery

References

Hall
Sports halls of fame
Halls of fame in Australia
Australian sports trophies and awards
Hall
Lists of Australian sportswomen
Awards established in 2008
Sports organizations established in 2008
2008 establishments in Australia